Naesbyhoved Lake (Næsbyhoved Sø) was a lake in Denmark,  north of Odense's current center. A small part of the lake's eastern section is included in the Odense Canal and Odense Inner Harbour, which had been excavated in the years 1796 to 1804 (and subsequent expansion), while the rest of the parched land passed to include Åløkke Farm. The lake supported five islands: Store Thor Lund (and Little Thor Lund), Great Holm Brase, Brase Small Holm, Vieholmen and Gåseholmen. Naesbyhoved Castle (Næsbyhoved Slot) was on a peninsula from the lake's northern shore; it was destroyed during the Count's Feud in 1534.

References

Bibliography

External links
Google Earth view

Lakes of Denmark
Geography of Odense
Former lakes of Europe